Steve Martin (born August 14, 1952 in Millinocket, Maine) is a sportscaster, calling primarily college football and both pro and college basketball. He studied political science and history at the University of Maine. He has called Atlantic Coast Conference basketball and football. On the professional side, he has served as a broadcaster for the Charlotte Hornets, New Orleans Hornets and Charlotte Bobcats.  He was also the voice of the Davidson College Wildcats on WBT-1110 from 1982 to 1987. On February 27, 2018, the Charlotte Hornets announced that Martin would be retiring at the conclusion of the 2017-18 NBA season.

References

External links
 

Living people
American radio sports announcers
American television sports announcers
College basketball announcers in the United States
College football announcers
National Basketball Association broadcasters
National Football League announcers
Carolina Panthers announcers
Charlotte Bobcats announcers
Charlotte Hornets announcers
New Orleans Hornets announcers
1952 births